In enzymology, a guanosine phosphorylase is an enzyme that catalyzes the chemical reaction

guanosine + phosphate  guanine + alpha-D-ribose 1-phosphate

Thus, the two substrates of this enzyme are guanosine and phosphate, whereas its two products are guanine and alpha-D-ribose 1-phosphate.

This enzyme belongs to the family of glycosyltransferases, specifically the pentosyltransferases.  The systematic name of this enzyme class is guanosine:phosphate alpha-D-ribosyltransferase. This enzyme participates in purine metabolism.

References 

 

EC 2.4.2
Enzymes of unknown structure